Strellc (Streočka planina) is a mountain in Western Kosovo, in the Accursed Mountains range. To its right are the Plains of Dukagjin. At  peak, Streoc stands out very well and from the city of Peja there is a good view of the whole mountain. The village of Strellc found around the mountain is named after the mountain. From the town of Klina in the far east of the valley Strellc looks to be even higher than Gjeravica, the highest mountain in Kosovo. The mountain located in Strellc is known to be highly rich in minerals and other valuable materials. The favourable position of Strellc, makes the village a place of great interest for foreign investors.

Notes

References

Mountains of Kosovo
Accursed Mountains
Two-thousanders of Kosovo